Walfisch is an uninhabited German island, in the Bay of Mecklenburg in the Baltic Sea.

History 
During the Thirty Years' War there was a fortress located on the island, which today is mainly under water. Relics of this are still being discovered today through aerial archaeology.

The fortress of Walfisch was destroyed in the year 1717 after the Northern Wars.

References 

Uninhabited islands of Germany
German islands in the Baltic
Wismar
Bay of Wismar
Islands of Mecklenburg-Western Pomerania